In mathematics, the Munn semigroup is the inverse semigroup of isomorphisms between principal ideals of a semilattice (a commutative semigroup of idempotents). Munn semigroups are named for the Scottish mathematician Walter Douglas Munn (1929–2008).

Construction's steps

Let  be a semilattice.

1) For all e in E, we define Ee: = {i ∈ E : i ≤ e} which is a principal ideal of E.

2) For all e, f in E, we define Te,f as the set of isomorphisms of Ee onto Ef.

3) The Munn semigroup of the semilattice E is defined as:  TE :=  { Te,f : (e, f) ∈ U }.

The semigroup's operation is composition of partial mappings. In fact, we can observe that TE ⊆ IE where IE is the symmetric inverse semigroup because all isomorphisms are partial one-one maps from subsets of E onto subsets of E.

The idempotents of the Munn semigroup are the identity maps 1Ee.

Theorem

Example
Let . Then  is a semilattice under the usual ordering of the natural numbers.

Thus  = {} where  is the identity map from En to itself, and  if .
In this example,

References

.
.

Semigroup theory